Novotrans Group of Companies is a Russian transportation holding involved in railway cargo operations, carriage maintenance, infrastructure projects, stevedoring, seaport operations. This is one of the largest private operators of rolling stock in Russian Federation and CIS countries with main focus on transportation of coal, gravel, timber, steel products and construction cargo. The holding comprises 24 companies in various regions of Russia and CIS. It is headed by the President Konstantin Goncharov.

History 

The company was founded in 2004.

In 2008, the company's own carriage repair facility was commissioned in the settlement of Tayturka, Irkutsk oblast; in 2009 — in Prokopyevsk, Kemerovo oblast; in 2012 — in Biysk, Altai krai; in 2013 — in Kashira, Moscow oblast. Construction of Baltic carriage repair factory was commenced in 2019 in Volosovsky District of Leningrad oblast.

In 2016, the company joined a self-regulatory organization called "Railway Transport Operators Union" (RTOU).

In 2018, Novotrans commenced the construction of a multipurpose trade terminal Lugaport at Ust-Luga Multimodal Complex in Ust-Luga, Leningrad oblast, in the Luga Bay of the Gulf of Finland. 

In 2019, the Group finalized the purchase of JSC "Global-service". This made Novotrans the general agent of Rosmorport (Russian government seaport operator) as stevedoring company on route between Ust-Luga and Baltiysk port in Kaliningrad oblast.

Present time 

Currently, the holding comprises 24 companies in various regions of Russia and CIS. It employs over 3500 workers. The total volume of the rolling stock exceeds 25,000 units.
 
Four carriage repair factories are a part of the holding. These include Kashira Carriage Repair Factory, Kuzbass Carriage Repair Facility (KCRF, consisting of two production lines), Biysk Carriage Repair Facility, carriage repair facility in the settlement of Tayturka (JSC VRP) and Baltic Carriage Repair Factory in Volosovo.

In the beginning of 2020, the second line of KCRF was completed, which increased its production capacity to 30,000 carriages per annum and made it the largest carriage repair factory in Russia. Ministry of Economic Development of Russia assigned to KCRF a status of the resident of Prokopyevsk territory of advanced social-economic development, located in the Kemerovo oblast.

Repair operations of own carriages account for 50% of Novotrans factories utilization rate, the other half is a separate business.

The company conducts construction of the multipurpose cargo terminal Lugaport in the Ust-Luga port. The project specifies the creation of grain processing and food processing terminals, as well as 3 piers for transshipment of general and loose cargo. Projected volume of transshipment is 24.3 million tons per annum, processing volume — 1100 carriages per day. According to the plan, construction will be executed in 3 phases and is scheduled to be completed by 2024. In January 2020, the JSC "Company — Ust-Luga", which was founded in 1992 for the project execution of the sea trade port Ust-Luga, joined the holding. 

The president of the Novotrans holding, Konstantin Goncharov, is a member of the RTOU panel, member of the executive board of the Russian Union of Industrialists and Entrepreneurs (RUIE/RSPP), chairman of the RUIE commission on sports industry, RUIE sector head of the development of non-public railway transport. Within the framework of RUIE Novotrans supports the operation of Russian-Greek cooperation and investment council under RUIE.

The company finances the charity fund Novotrans-5P, which acts as a custodian of orphanages and care homes, provides support to gifted children, supports memorial projects related to The Great Patriotic War (search units, reburial initiatives, etc.).

Economic performance 

Annual cargo turnover of Novotrans carriages is approximately 146 billion tonne-kilometres. Over 70,000 carriages are serviced, overhaul is conducted on over 80,000 wheelpairs.

In 2019, over 30 million tonnes of cargo were transported, cargo turnover amounted to 129 billion tonne-kilometres.

Forecast market cost of the holding assets at the year-end of 2019 was 70 billion rubles, revenue – over 40 billion rubles. The company claims that it was capable of doubling its own assets.

In August 2019, the holding was assigned a ruA credit rating with "stable" forecast by the credit rating agency Expert RA.

References 

Transport companies of Russia